Taochuan may refer to the following places in China:

Taochuan, Hunan
Taochuan, Shaanxi